Hugues Tshiyinga Mafo (born 14 January 1983) is a DR Congo sprinter. He competed in the 100 metres event at the 2013 World Championships in Athletics.

References

External links
 

1983 births
Living people
Democratic Republic of the Congo male sprinters
Place of birth missing (living people)
World Athletics Championships athletes for the Democratic Republic of the Congo
21st-century Democratic Republic of the Congo people